The Emergency Medical Services for Children (EMSC) program is a US federal government health initiative. It is administered by the U.S. Department of Health and Human Services’ Health Resources and Services Administration (HRSA), and the Maternal and Child Health Bureau (MCHB). Its aim is to reduce child and youth disability and death due to severe illness or injury by increasing awareness among health professionals, provider and planners and the general public of the special (physiological and psychological) needs of children receiving emergency medical care.

Background
In the Korean and Vietnam wars, medical experience demonstrated that survival rates improved dramatically when patients were stabilized in the field and transported immediately to a well-equipped emergency facility.  During the 1960s, civilian medical and surgical communities recognized the possibility of applying this principle to an EMS system.

Support
In 1973, Congress passed the Emergency Medical Services Systems Act of 1973. Managed by the HRSA, it provided funding for more comprehensive state and local government EMS systems. Between 1975 and 1979, state EMS systems dramatically improved outcomes of adult patients but not those of pediatric patients. In 1979, Calvin C.J. Sia, MD, then-president of the Hawaii Medical Association, requested that the members of the American Academy of Pediatrics (AAP) develop EMS programs designed to decrease disability and death in children.  Dr. Sia was joined by José B. Lee, then-executive officer of the Hawaii Medical Association Emergency Medical Services Program in requesting that U.S. Senator Daniel K. Inouye introduce legislation to establish, implement and fund a national initiative designed to address emergency medical services for children systems development.  Soon after, Senator Daniel Inouye (D-HI) responded to this request by introducing a legislative vehicle in the United States Senate. His staff assistant and chief of staff Patrick DeLeon's daughter was hospitalized with meningitis. The girl's treatment demonstrated the shortcomings of an average emergency department when treating a critically ill child. Senators Orrin Hatch(R-UT) and Lowell Weicker(R-CT) also gave their support. In 1984, Congress enacted legislation (Public Law 98-555) authorizing the use of federal funds for emergency medical services for children (EMSC). By this law, and through the administration of the MCHB, the EMSC program obtained funds to improve the pediatric capabilities of existing emergency medical services systems. In 1985, Congress designated initial funding for the EMSC program and in 1986, the first federal grants were utilized in Alabama, California, New York, and Oregon.

Federal program
The federal EMSC program is designed to ensure that all children and adolescents receive appropriate care in a health emergency. Since 1985, the EMSC program has provided grants to all states, and the District of Columbia, five U.S. territories, and three Freely Associated States. Additional EMSC program funding has been used to establish national resource centers and a pediatric emergency care research network.

Program accountability
To measure the effectiveness of federal grant programs, the HRSA requires grantees to report on specific performance measures related to their grant funded activities. The measures are part of the Government Performance Results Act (GPRA). In order to receive or continue to receive Program funds, all EMSC grantees must provide data on measures 71 to 80:
 The percent of prehospital provider agencies in the state or territory that have on-line pediatric medical direction available from dispatch through patient transport to a definitive care facility.
 The percent of prehospital provider agencies in the state/territory that have off-line pediatric medical direction available from dispatch through patient transport to a definitive care facility.
 The percent of patient care units in the state or territory that have essential pediatric equipment and supplies as outlined in national guidelines.
 The percent of hospitals recognized through a statewide, territorial, or regional standardized system that are able to stabilize or manage pediatric medical emergencies.
 The percent of hospitals recognized through a statewide, territorial, or regional standardized system that are able to stabilize and/or manage pediatric traumatic emergencies.
 The percentage of hospitals in the state/territory that have written interfacility transfer guidelines that cover pediatric patients and that include pre-defined components of transfer.
 The percent of hospitals in the state/territory that have written interfacility transfer agreements that cover pediatric patients.
 The adoption of requirements by the state/territory for pediatric emergency education for license/certification renewal of BLS/ALS providers.
 The degree to which state/territories have established permanence of EMSC in the state/territory EMS system by establishing an EMSC Advisory Committee, incorporating pediatric representation on the EMS Board, and hiring a full-time EMSC manager.
 The degree to which state/territories have established permanence of EMSC in the state/territory EMS system by integrating EMSC priorities into statutes/regulations.

Partnerships
The program works with a variety of national and professional organizations to identify and address the key issues affecting EMS, including but not limited to: managed care, disaster preparedness, children with special health care needs, mental health, family-centered care, and cultural diversity.  The program develops national task forces and publishes comprehensive reports drawing attention to many of these issues.

Emergency department readiness project
In 2013, the American Academy of Pediatrics, the American College of Emergency Physicians, the Emergency Nurses Association, and the EMSC cooperated in a quality improvement project. Approximately 5,000 EDs were offered an assessment of their department's readiness, based on six topic areas published in the 2009 Guidelines for the Care of Children in the Emergency Department (or National Guidelines). The assessment was conducted over a period of seven months. The response rate of EDs was over eighty percent. Assessments were completed by August 2013. Upon completion of their assessment, each emergency department was given a pediatric readiness score, a gap analysis and access to an on-line toolkit to assist in  quality improvement initiatives.

Inter-facility transfer tool kit for the pediatric patient
In collaboration with the Emergency Nurses Association and the Society of Trauma Nurses, the EMSC developed the Inter Facility Transfer Tool Kit for the Pediatric Patient. The toolkit includes an algorithm for developing transfer processes; talking points; example guidelines, agreements, and memorandums of understanding; and case presentations.

Equipment list for ambulances
The American College of Surgeons Committee on Trauma, the National Association of EMS Physicians, the American College of Emergency Physicians (ACEP), and the EMSC Partnership for Children Stakeholder Group collaborated to revise the recommended equipment list for ambulances. This revised document was to be used to evaluate the availability of pediatric equipment and supplies for basic and advanced life support.

Pediatric medication safety in the emergency department
Duke University and the AAP convened a multidisciplinary panel provide recommendations to improve pediatric medication safety in the emergency department.

Emergency Medical Treatment and Labor Act (EMTALA)
The George Washington University School of Public Health and Health Services Department of Health Policy and the NRC published an issue brief entitled The Application of the Emergency Medical Treatment and Labor Act (EMTALA) to Hospital Inpatients.

EMS-related research
The Federal Interagency Committee on EMS and the EMSCNRC conducted a gap analysis of EMS related research. The analysis included over 270 articles. Its aim was to provide an evidence base for decision makers.

PECARN

The EMSCNRC has collaborated with the Pediatric Emergency Care Applied Research Network (PECARN), the first federally funded pediatric emergency medicine research network.

References

External links
 EMSC Innovation and Improvement Center, a department within University Hospitals Rainbow Babies & Children's Hospital and the University of Texas at Austin Dell Medical School.
 The National EMSC Data Analysis Resource Center, Salt Lake City, UT.
 Pediatric Emergency Care Applied Research Network, the first federally funded pediatric emergency medicine research network in the United States.

Children's health in the United States
Emergency medical services in the United States
Health Resources and Services Administration